Östergötlands BF was a bandy team. They lost the 1908 Swedish Championship final to Djurgårdens IF with 3–1 at Idrottsparken.

Honours

Domestic
 Swedish Champions:
 Runners-up (1): 1908

References

Sport in Östergötland County
Bandy clubs in Sweden